The Sakurai reaction (also known as the Hosomi–Sakurai reaction) is the chemical reaction of carbon electrophiles (such as a ketone shown here) with allyltrimethylsilane catalyzed by strong Lewis acids.

Lewis acid activation is essential for complete reaction. Strong Lewis acids such as titanium tetrachloride, boron trifluoride, tin tetrachloride, and AlCl(Et)2 are all effective in promoting the Hosomi reaction. The reaction is a type of electrophilic allyl shift with formation of an intermediate beta-silyl carbocation. Driving force is the stabilization of said carbocation by the beta-silicon effect.

The Hosomi-Sakurai reaction can be performed on a number of functional groups. An electrophilic carbon, activated by a Lewis acid, is required. Below is a list of different functional groups that can be used in the Hosomi–Sakurai reaction.  The reaction achieves results similar to the addition of an allyl Grignard reagent to the carbonyl.

Mechanism

 The Hosomi-Sakurai reactions are allylation reactions which involve use of allyl silanes as allylmetal reagents. This section demonstrates examples of allylation of diverse ketones. In figure 1, allylation of a carbonyl ketone (compound containing a ketone group and two different functional groups) has been shown. In the given reaction, the electrophilic compound (carbon with a ketone group) is treated with titanium tetrachloride, a strong Lewis acid and allyltrimethylsilane. According to the general principle, the Lewis acid first activates the electrophilic carbon in presence of allyltrimethylsilane which then undergoes nucleophilic attack from electrons on the allylic silane. The silicon plays the key role in stabilizing the carbocation of carbon at the β-position. Hosomi-Sakurai reaction is also applicable for other functional groups such as enones, where conjugate addition is usually seen. In figure 2, the Hosomi- Sakurai reaction has been shown using a cinnamoyl ketone. This reaction follows the same mechanism as the previous reaction shown here.

Beta-silicon effect stabilization
As displayed in the mechanism, the Hosomi–Sakurai reaction goes through a secondary carbocation intermediate. Secondary carbocations are inherently unstable, however the β-silicon effect from the silicon atom stabilizes the carbocation. Silicon is able to donate into an empty p-orbital, and the silicon orbital is shared between the two carbons. This stabilizes the positive charge over 3 orbitals. Another term for the β-silicon effect is silicon-hyperconjugation. This interaction is essential for the reaction to go to completion.

Literature of historic interest

(

References

External links
 Hosomi-Sakurai reaction @ www.organic-chemistry.org Link
 Akira Hosomi HP

Addition reactions
Carbon-carbon bond forming reactions
Name reactions